Bullying in the legal profession is believed to be more common than in some other professions. It is believed that its adversarial, hierarchical tradition contributes towards this. Women, trainees and solicitors who have been qualified for five years or less are more impacted, as are ethnic minority lawyers and lesbian, gay and bisexual lawyers.

Half of women lawyers and one in three men who took part in a study by the Law Council of Australia (LCA) reported they had been bullied or intimidated in the workplace. The Law Council of Australia has found that women face significant levels of discrimination, with one of the study's key figures telling Lawyers Weekly the profession is a "men's only club".

According to former High Court judge Michael Kirby, the rudeness of judges trickles down to senior lawyers who then vent their frustrations on more junior staff, thus creating a cycle of bullying and stress that is rife within the legal profession.

See also
 Legal abuse

References

Further reading
 Omari, M. & Paull, M. (2014). “Shut up and bill”: Workplace bullying challenges for the legal profession. International Journal of the Legal Profession. Volume 20, Issue 2, 2013 p1-20.

External links 
 Bullying in the UK legal profession Case history #50
 Bullying in the UK legal profession Case history #52
 James Barnes 16 October 2012 The Global Legal Post Bullying rife in English legal profession
 Sophie Schroder 8 Oct 2014 Australasian Lawyer Lawyers some of Australia’s worst bullies?
 The Connecticut Law Tribune August 27, 2014 Editorial: Confronting Bullying Within the Legal Profession
 Knocking Out Bullying in the Legal Profession
 Civility Matters: Rudeness and Bullying in the Legal Profession
 8 January 2014 Legal Futures Bullying at work on the rise, says lawyer support charity
 David Yamada December 10, 2013 Bullying lawyer suspended from practice for two years
 Harriet Alexander March 23, 2013 DPP warns lawyers: stop bullying one another or else
 Bullying at Work Legal Organizations, Coping Strategies, and Health Problems
 Lawyer says firm's harassment made her ill March 3, 2010 Ben Schneiders

Abuse of the legal system
Workplace bullying
Practice of law
Legal ethics
Persecution